Amun-her-khepeshef (died c. 1254 BC; also Amonhirkhopshef, Amun-her-wenemef and Amun-her-khepeshef A to distinguish him from later people of the same name) was the firstborn son of Pharaoh Ramesses II and Queen Nefertari.

Name
He was born when his father was still a co-regent with Seti I. He was originally called Amun-her-wenemef ("Amun Is with His Right Arm"). He changed his name to Amun-her-khepeshef ("Amun Is with His Strong Arm") early in his father's reign. He appears to have changed his name once again to Seth-her-khepeshef around Year 20 of Ramesses II. Seth-her-khepeshef was formerly thought to be another son of Ramesses II.

Biography
Amun-her-khepeshef was the crown prince of Egypt for the first 25 years of Ramesses II's reign but eventually predeceased his father in Year 25 of his father's reign. Ramesses B, Ramesses II's second oldest son then succeeded him as Crown Prince for another 25 years (from Year 25 to Year 50 of this pharaoh's reign). Merenptah, Ramesses II's 13th son, would later assume the throne in Year 67 of Ramesses II.

Amun-her-khepeshef, as heir to the throne, held several titles. Some of them were unique such as "Commander of the Troops", "Effective Confidant" and "Eldest Son of the King of his Body." Some of his other titles were shared with other prominent princes such as "Fan-bearer on the King's Right Hand" and "Royal Scribe". His titles indicate that he held a high position in the army, and according to some relief depictions, he and his younger half-brother Khaemwaset fought in the Battle of Kadesh and the campaigns in Nubia (or at least he accompanied his father to these battles). He appears on a wall in the Temple of Beit el-Wali. Amun-her-khepeshef was involved in an exchange of diplomatic correspondence with the Hittites after Ramesses II's Year 21 peace treaty with them.

Statues and depictions of Amun-her-khepeshef appear in his father's famous temples in Abu Simbel, Luxor, in the Ramesseum, and in Seti's Abydos temple. He is depicted with his father lassoing a bull in the Abydos temple walls and appears frequently on Ramesses II's statues.

Death
Amun-her-khepeshef died around Year 25 of his father's reign. He is known to have had a wife named Nefertari – who could be identical with Ramesses' daughter, Nefertari, possibly a child of Queen Nefertari – and a son named Seti. The next crown prince was his half-brother Ramesses, the eldest son of Queen Isetnofret. Amun-her-khepeshef was buried in tomb KV5 in the Valley of the Kings, in a large tomb built for the sons of Ramesses II. His interment was apparently inspected in Year 53 of Ramesses II.

Among the artefacts found in the tomb were canopic jars labeled with Amun-her-khepeshef's name and containing organs. Also found were bones from four males including a skull with a deep fracture, believed to have been made by a mace.

See also
 List of children of Ramesses II
 Nineteenth Dynasty of Egypt family tree

References

Ancient Egyptian princes
Heirs to the ancient Egyptian throne
Nineteenth Dynasty of Egypt
1250s BC deaths
Ramesses II
Year of birth unknown
Fan-bearer on the Right Side of the King
Children of Ramesses II
Heirs apparent who never acceded